Zorubicin (INN) is an anthracycline.

Anthracyclines
Topoisomerase inhibitors
Hydrazides
Phenols
Phenol ethers